The 2008–09 Serie A1 is the 90th season of the Serie A1, Italy's premier Water polo league.

Seasons in Italian water polo competitions
Italy
Serie A1
Serie A1
2008 in water polo
2009 in water polo